Prince Dmitry Bagration-Imeretinsky (1799–1845) was a Georgian royal prince (batonishvili) of the royal Bagrationi dynasty of Imereti. He was born to Prince George of Imereti and Princess Darejan Eristavi of Racha (1779–1816).

Major General of Imperial Russian Army. A graduate of the Page Corps. Participant of Russo-Turkish War (1828–29) and November Uprising in 1830. He commanded the Uhlan and Hussar troops. Since 1833 commander of Courland Dragoons. Awarded with Order of St. Anna, Order of Saint Stanislaus, Order of the Red Eagle and Order of St. Vladimir.

In 1842 he married Olga Valerianovna Strzhemen-Stroinovskaya (1824–1853) and had 2 children: 
Aleksandr (1843–1880)
Dmitry (1846–1885)

He died on 6 November 1845 in Saint Petersburg, Russia. He is buried in the Lazarevskoe Cemetery at the Alexander Nevsky Lavra on Lazarevskoe cemetery.

References

1799 births
1845 deaths
Georgian princes
Bagrationi dynasty of the Kingdom of Imereti
Russian people of the November Uprising
Recipients of the Order of St. Anna
Recipients of the Order of St. Vladimir
Imperial Russian Army generals
Georgian generals in the Imperial Russian Army
Georgian major generals (Imperial Russia)
Burials at Lazarevskoe Cemetery (Saint Petersburg)